The World Pool-Billiard Association (WPA) is the international governing body for pool (pocket billiards). It was formed in 1987, and was initially headed by a provisional board of directors consisting of representatives from Australia, Americas, Africa, and Europe. As of 2023, the WPA president is Ishaun Singh of South Africa. It is an associate of the World Confederation of Billiards Sports (WCBS), the international umbrella organization that encompasses the major cue sports.

History
In the late 1970s, Kazuo Fujima of Japan invited various European players to compete in the All Japan Championship. This led to cooperation with Europe, being the first time contacts between Europe and Asian associations had been made. However, most of the efforts were initiated by individuals, and progressed slowly. By the mid-80s, many European players, who had the European Pool Championship as their highest level of competition, have been aware of pool events in the United States and were dissatisfied with the development of the sport in the continent, and wanted to compete at a higher level.

In November 1987, at a European Pocket Billiard Federation (EPBF) board meeting in Germany, the idea of a worldwide competition resurfaced. The EPBF board members used their own money to fund a group to create a logo, letterheads and communications with various pool organizations. Kazuo Fujima of Japan replied that Asia was interested in participating.

In May 1988, the group's general assembly was held in conjunction alongside the European Pool Championship in Stockholm, Sweden. The group formed a provisional board that consisted of Kazuo Fujima (Japan), Paul Gerni (USA), Jorgen Sandman (Sweden), and Horst Vondenhoff (Germany).

In March 1990, the inaugural WPA World Nine-ball Championship was held in Bergheim, Germany. The playing field included 32 men and 16 women in separate divisions, and has since become an annual event.

On March 3, 1990, the World Pool-Billiard Association was sanctioned by the general assembly as the international governing body for pool. The acronym WPA was selected so it would not conflict with the existing Women's Professional Billiard Association (WPBA).

Membership in the WPA has grown since its inception. In 1991, Australia and New Zealand, under the umbrella of the Australasian Pool Association, became members. In 1999, the organizations associated with Latin America and the Caribbean became members, and in 2000, a substantial portion of the organizations from Africa joined.

Currently sanctioned tournaments
 WPA World Nine-ball Championship
 WPA World Ten-ball Championship
 WPA World Eight-ball Championship
 WPA World Blackball Championship
 WPA World Artistic Pool Championship

Member confederations and countries
The WPA members are grouped by six continental/regional confederations, who in turn, consist of members from a country's national federation. The chart and table shows the WPA's members :

Board members
, the WPA board consist of:
 Ishaun Singh (South Africa), President
 Shane Tyree (North America), Vice President & Sports Director 
 Javiera Rivera (South America), Board Member
 Melvin Chia (Malaysia), Board Member
 Stuart Rogers (Australia), Board Member
 Jorgen Sandman (Sweden), Board Member
 Kelly Fisher (Great Britain), Player Representative

See also
List of professional sports leagues
List of world eight-ball champions
List of WPA World Nine-ball champions

Notes

References

External links

Cue sports governing bodies
Pool organizations
Carom billiards organizations
Sports organizations established in 1987
Organisations based in Sydney